Frederick Robert Hoyer Millar, 1st Baron Inchyra  (6 June 1900 – 16 October 1989), was a British diplomat who served as Ambassador to West Germany from 1955 to 1956.

Background and early career
The son of Robert Hoyer Millar, he was educated at Wellington and New College, Oxford. Millar entered the Diplomatic Service in 1923, becoming Second Secretary in 1928 and First Secretary in 1935. He served in various capacities at the British embassies in Berlin, Paris and Cairo and at the Foreign Office. From 1934 to 1938 he was Assistant Private Secretary to the Foreign Secretary (Sir John Simon, Sir Samuel Hoare and Anthony Eden respectively).

Senior diplomatic appointments
During the Second World War he served chiefly at the British embassy in Washington D.C., where he was also Minister Plenipotentiary from 1948 to 1950. Millar was also the United Kingdom Deputy at the North Atlantic Council from 1950 to 1952 and its Representative thereon from 1952 to 1953. The latter year Millar was appointed High Commissioner to the British Zone of occupied Germany, a post he held until 1955, and was then Ambassador to West Germany from 1955 to 1956. After his return to Britain he served as Permanent Under-Secretary at the Foreign Office from 1957 to 1962.

Honours and personal life
Millar was made a KCMG in 1949 and a GCMG in 1956, and in 1962 he was raised to the peerage as Baron Inchyra, of St Madoes in the County of Perth.  He was appointed King of Arms of the Order of St Michael and St George in 1961.

Lord Inchyra married in 1931 Jonkvrouw Anna Judith Elisabeth de Marees van Swinderen (1906–1999), daughter of Jonkheer René de Marees van Swinderen, Dutch former Minister of Foreign Affairs (1908–13) and Ambassador in London (1913–37). They had four children, two sons and two daughters. Their older daughter Elizabeth married Billy Wallace in 1965.

Their younger daughter, Dame Annabel Whitehead, was a Lady-in-Waiting to Princess Margaret and later to the Queen.

His granddaughter Martha Hoyer Millar was married to Conservative Party politician Matt Hancock.

Arms

Death
Lord Inchyra died in October 1989, aged 89. He was succeeded in the Barony by his elder son, Robert, the 2nd Baron Inchyra.

References

Kidd, Charles, Williamson, David (editors). Debrett's Peerage and Baronetage (1990 edition). New York: St Martin's Press, 1990.

1900 births
1989 deaths
People educated at Wellington College, Berkshire
Alumni of New College, Oxford
Knights Grand Cross of the Order of St Michael and St George
Commanders of the Royal Victorian Order
Members of HM Diplomatic Service
Diplomatic peers
Millar, Frederick
Millar, Frederick
Millar, Frederick
Place of birth missing
Place of death missing
Hereditary barons created by Elizabeth II
20th-century British diplomats
Permanent Representatives of the United Kingdom to NATO